The Vesuvians is a 1997 Italian anthology film directed by Antonio Capuano, Pappi Corsicato, Antonietta de Lillo, Stefano Incerti and Mario Martone. It consists of five segments, all set in Naples. It was entered into the main competition at the 1997 Venice Film Festival.

Cast 
Anna Bonaiuto
Toni Servillo
Iaia Forte
Renato Carpentieri
Teresa Saponangelo
Clelia Rondinella

References

External links

1997 films
Italian drama films
1997 drama films
Films directed by Mario Martone
Italian anthology films
Films set in Naples
Films directed by Pappi Corsicato
1990s Italian-language films
1990s Italian films